De Wet is the name of:

 Jacob Willemszoon de Wet (c. 1610 – between 1675 and 1691), Dutch painter
Christiaan de Wet (1854–1922), Boer general, rebel leader and politician
De Wet Decoration, South African military medal named after the above
Nicolaas Jacobus de Wet (1873–1960), Chief Justice of South Africa and acting Governor-General 
Quartus de Wet (1899–1980), son of the above, South African judge and judge-president of the Transvaal, and presiding judge of the 1963 Rivonia Trial, where he sentenced Nelson Mandela and other anti-apartheid activists to life imprisonment.
 Johannes Christiaan de Wet (1912–1990), South African jurist
 De Wet Barry (born 1978), South African rugby union footballer 
 Friedel de Wet (born 1980), South African cricketer
 Jane de Wet (born 1996), South African actress

Dutch-language surnames
Afrikaans-language surnames